Končar – Engineering Ltd. for production and services (in Croatian: Končar – Inženjering d.o.o. za proizvodnju i usluge; abbreviated name KONČAR - KET) is a limited liability company based in Zagreb. Since its foundation in 1991, company has established itself as a respectable engineering company whose core activity is the construction and reconstruction of complex buildings and plants on a "turnkey" basis in the power industry, railway infrastructure, and automation and management.

Products and services

Construction and revitalization of Hydro Power Plants
Electrical substation;
Plants and equipment intended for Thermal power station;
Railway Infrastructure
Automation and control

Organisation charter

Electric power (Hydroelectric and thermal power plants, Transformer stations, Dispatch centers)
Renewable energy sources (Solar power plants, Small hydropower plants, Cogeneration plants, Wind power plants)
Railway infrastructure (Electric traction plants, signaling and safety systems)
Automation and control (Automation, regulation, control and protection, Remote control systems, Electronic monitoring and telecommunications)

References, buyers and export countries

The Company has been continuously present on the global market with:
More than 100 hydro power plants, 50 thermal power plants and 100 diesel power plants in the world
More than 300 transformer substations of 72.5 to 420 kV
More than 3000 distribution transformer substations of up to 38 kV of various types
More than 40 electric traction substations of 25 kV (50 Hz) and more than 40 sectionalising plants of 25 kV (50 Hz)
Several reactive power compensation plants 25 kV, 1ph
14 micro-computer controlled level crossings
More than 100 remote control systems
More than 120 water pumping stations in Egypt, Iraq and Algeria
Several industrial power generation plants
More than 1000 vessels equipped with electrical equipment and complete electrical plants 

Largest domestic buyers:
HEP (CROATIAN POWER AUTHORITY), ZET (ZAGREB ELECTRIC TRAMCAR)
HŽ (CROATIAN RAILWAYS), INA (CROATIAN OIL INDUSTRY), HAC (CROATIAN MOTORWAYS)

Recent exporting countries: 
Albania, Austria, Bosnia And Herzegovina, Canada, Colombia, Costa Rica, Egypt, France, Greece, Germany, Hungary, Iceland, India, Iraq, Kenya, Macedonia, Netherlands, Nigeria, Peru, Romania, Rwanda, Slovenia, Serbia, Sweden, Turkey, Zambia.

References

Engineering companies of Croatia
Manufacturing companies based in Zagreb